Imashpania is a genus of moths in the  family Tortricidae. It consists of only one species, Imashpania mashpinana, which is found in Ecuador (Pichincha Province, Carchi Province).

The wingspan is about 22 mm. The ground colour of the forewings is brown with some ochreous and rust diffuse spots at the base of the wing and postmedially. The hindwings are dark brown.

Etymology
The genus name is an anagram of the specific name of the type-species. The species name refers to Río Mashpi, the type locality.

References

Cochylini
Monotypic moth genera
Taxa named by Józef Razowski